Tibor Bojati is a Hungarian sprint canoer who competed in the late 1980s. He won a bronze medal in the K-4 10000 m event at the 1986 ICF Canoe Sprint World Championships in Montreal in a team with Tibor Helyi, László Nieberl and Kálmán Petrovics.

References

Hungarian male canoeists
Living people
Year of birth missing (living people)
ICF Canoe Sprint World Championships medalists in kayak
20th-century Hungarian people